Details of Australia's Bravery Medal and how to nominate for it are available on the "Itsanhonour" Web site



Citation lists

List

References

Bravery Medal